Aidos or Aedos (Greek:) was the Greek goddess of shame, modesty, respect, and humility. Aidos, as a quality, was that feeling of reverence or shame which restrains men from wrong. It also encompassed the emotion that a rich person might feel in the presence of the impoverished, that their disparity of wealth, whether a matter of luck or merit, was ultimately undeserved. Ancient and Christian humility share common themes: they both reject egotism, self-centeredness, arrogance, and excessive pride; they also recognize human limitations. Aristotle defined it as a middle ground between vanity and cowardice. 

"As we become more accomplished in something, we tend to take pride in our advances and see our growing mastery, particularly when accompanied by the pleasure or approval of others, as a spur to further improvements. A pianist likes to show off her skill in playing a Beethoven sonata; an apprentice cabinetmaker feels quiet satisfaction in the work of his hands; a dancer delights in knowing the pleasure her movements bring to another. But humility is, by definition, a virtue that systematically denies us these satisfactions. It is the virtue in which we should never take pride, whether that pride is generated entirely by ourselves or fed by the approval of others."

The problem of humility is in the self-satisfaction of providing ourselves with credit for any improvement or accomplishment with which we gain, may have provided to others too, when pursuing the virtue of humility we are likely to recognize improvements, that is the result of becoming more humble. Humility is resistant to self-evaluation and self-appreciation, undertaking either is like undoing whole effort.

Mythology 
She was the last goddess to leave the earth after the Golden Age. She was a close companion of the goddess of vengeance Nemesis. One source calls her daughter of Prometheus. Mythologically, she is often considered to be more of a personification than a physical deity.

There are references to her in various early Greek plays, such as Prometheus Bound by Aeschylus, Iphigenia at Aulis by Euripides, and Oedipus Rex by Sophocles.

There were altars to Aidos in Athens and in Sparta.

Some sources mention Aeschyne as a personification of shame and reverence; this figure appears to be equivalent to Aidos.

See also

 Eleos: Goddess of pity, mercy, clemency, and compassion.
 Epiphron: God of prudence.  
 Sophrosyne: Goddess of moderation and temperance.

Notes

References 
 Aeschylus, translated in two volumes. 1. Seven Against Thebes by Herbert Weir Smyth, Ph. D. Cambridge, MA. Harvard University Press. 1926. Online version at the Perseus Digital Library. Greek text available from the same website.
Bell, Robert E., Women of Classical Mythology: A Biographical Dictionary. ABC-Clio. 1991. .
Douglas L. Cairns, Aidos: The Psychology and Ethics of Honour and Shame in Ancient Greek Literature, Oxford, Clarendon Press, 1992.
Hesiod, Works and Days from The Homeric Hymns and Homerica with an English Translation by Hugh G. Evelyn-White, Cambridge, MA.,Harvard University Press; London, William Heinemann Ltd. 1914. Online version at the Perseus Digital Library. Greek text available from the same website.
Mythology by Edith Hamilton
Pausanias, Description of Greece with an English Translation by W.H.S. Jones, Litt.D., and H.A. Ormerod, M.A., in 4 Volumes. Cambridge, MA, Harvard University Press; London, William Heinemann Ltd. 1918. . Online version at the Perseus Digital Library
Pausanias, Graeciae Descriptio. 3 vols. Leipzig, Teubner. 1903.  Greek text available at the Perseus Digital Library.
Pindar, Odes translated by Diane Arnson Svarlien. 1990. Online version at the Perseus Digital Library.
Pindar, The Odes of Pindar including the Principal Fragments with an Introduction and an English Translation by Sir John Sandys, Litt.D., FBA. Cambridge, MA., Harvard University Press; London, William Heinemann Ltd. 1937. Greek text available at the Perseus Digital Library.

Greek goddesses
Personifications in Greek mythology
Virtue